L. ferruginea may refer to:
 Ladenbergia ferruginea, a plant species endemic to Peru
 Limanda ferruginea, the yellowtail flounder, a fish species

See also
 Ferruginea (disambiguation)